Sienna, formerly known as Sienna Plantation, is a census-designated place and master-planned community located in  Fort Bend County, Texas, United States. It is mostly in the extraterritorial jurisdiction of Missouri City. The population was 20,204 at the 2020 census, up from 13,721 at the 2010 census.

History
The Sienna subdivision is on land that previously operated as a sugar and cotton plantation. Purchased in 1840 by South Carolinian Jonathan D. Waters, the tract included a wharf along the Brazos River. In 1872, Houston businessman Thomas W. House purchased the property, followed by former Houston mayor Thomas H. Scanlan in 1913. Scanlan's heirs' estate entrusted the property to the Scanlan Foundation, which benefited the Catholic Diocese of Houston. From the 1950s until 1972, the diocese operated the Cenacle Retreat on the land under the direction of the Cenacle Sisters.

In the 1970s developer Larry Johnson founded the Johnson Development Corporation and in 1978 began the development of the project. In the mid-1980s the Johnson Corporation began construction of single-family homes, roads, and a  levee for flood protection. The project stalled during the economic meltdown of the 1980s.

The developer refocused his efforts in 1994. The development of Sienna was organized by Tan Yu, a billionaire developer from the Philippines, who in 1997 was based in Taiwan. In 2009 5,000 of the 5,200 houses in Sienna Plantation were occupied.

In May 2019, the community changed its name from "Sienna Plantation" to Sienna in response to requests from Facebook groups, residents, and others.

Geography

Sienna is located in eastern Fort Bend County at  (29.493136, -95.506707). It is bordered to the north and west by Missouri City and to the northeast by Arcola. The Brazos River runs just west of the western border of Sienna, and Oyster Creek flows southwards through the center of the CDP.

Cityscape
The development is south of Texas State Highway 6. Sienna Parkway, the main thoroughfare in Sienna, is located off Highway 6. Sienna has many single-family houses of various designs and styles. In 2009 the prices ranged from $160,000s to the millions. A section of Sienna has custom houses that, as of 2009, were priced in the $500,000s. As of that year a 272-unit apartment complex was under construction at the entrance to Sienna.

Demographics

As of the 2020 United States census, there were 20,204 people, 6,089 households, and 5,494 families residing in the CDP.

As of the census of 2010, there were 13,721 people and 4,757 households in the CDP. The population density was 1008.9 people per square mile (388.7/km2). The racial makeup of the CDP was 57.2% White, 29.8% African American, 4.6% Asian, and 4.0% from two or more races. Hispanic or Latino of any race were 15.7% of the population.

Of the 13,721 people living in the CDP, 32.5% were under 18 years of age, with 4.3% under 5 years of age; 7.2% were age 65 or over.

For the period 2010–14, the estimated median annual income for a household in the CDP was $130,300, and the median income for a family was $130,457. Male full-time workers had a median income of $107,798 versus $74,224 for females. The per capita income for the CDP was $46,039. About 7.0% of families and 6.9% of the population were below the poverty line, including 3.6% of those under age 18 and 15.0% of those age 65 or over.

Government and infrastructure
In 1996 Missouri City and Sienna had a joint development agreement. It states that when Sienna is about 90% developed and when the City of Missouri City wishes to assume the outstanding development debt of Sienna Plantation, the annexation will occur. There are periodic reviews of the annexation proposals. In 2011, one review concluded that due to the municipal utility debt, if residents of Sienna, do not wish to pay extra taxes for fire and police services and other city services, then annexation should occur in 2027.

Education

Primary and secondary schools
Sienna is served by the Fort Bend Independent School District. The community is within the East Division, controlling school board slots 5 through 7.

The community is zoned to Sienna Crossing Elementary School, Scanlan Oaks Elementary School and Jan Schiff Elementary School (three separate attendance zones).  The community is also zoned to Baines Middle School, which is located within Sienna Plantation. All of Sienna is served by the new FBISD Ridge Point High School located in Sienna Plantation on Waters Lake Blvd.

Donald Leonetti Elementary School opened in 2017 and Ronald Thornton Middle School opened in 2018. Both are in Sienna Plantation.

Sienna Lutheran Academy is a private school that caters to the Christian education of children in grades K-8.

Histories of schools
Before 2010 the portion east of Sienna Parkway was zoned to Hightower High School in Missouri City, while the portion west of Sienna Parkway was zoned to Elkins High School in Missouri City. In 2007 sections of Sienna were rezoned from Hightower to Elkins.

Lake Olympia Middle School in Missouri City served all of Sienna until fall 2006, when Baines Middle School was built.

Community colleges
 
Houston Community College (HCC) served Sienna from the fall of 2008 until May 2016, when the campus was closed and a new campus was built on Texas Parkway.

Public libraries
Fort Bend County Libraries operates the Sienna Branch, which opened on April 24, 2010. The $15 million, two story facility, which has  of space, was a joint project between the library system and Houston Community College. 
As of May 2016, Houston Community College no longer has a presence in the library building.  The Sienna Branch has a 3D printer for the community to use and offers classes on 3D design and printing.

Parks and recreation

Zen T. C. Zheng of the Houston Chronicle said that Sienna has "a natural environment." The community has lakes, parks, trees, and a trail along  of the frontage of the Brazos River. Sienna has a  sports complex, an 18-hole championship golf course, recreational centers, an equestrian center, and water parks. The Sienna sports complex is the home to a variety of youth club sports programs, including, the Sienna Panthers Lacrosse Club which has 240 youth lacrosse players ranging from 1st grade to High School.  It is also the home field for Team 91 Texas which provides elite Lacrosse for 175 players to compete nationally. The recreational centers include an amphitheater and a fitness room.

In 2019, Sienna announced that they had completed renovations on the tennis center and the Club Sienna recreation complex. Added to the tennis center was outdoor covered seating and a new 1,764-square-foot building that features a tennis pro shop. The refurbished Club Sienna can now accommodate 85 people in its ballroom and offers a conference room for board meetings and a classroom for up to 25 students. Several restrooms were added and the lobby relocated.

Religion

As of 2011 many Protestant churches are located in Sienna. On April 30, 2011, an LDS Church meeting house was scheduled to open in the community, serving a 200-member English-speaking ward and a 200-member Spanish-speaking ward.
St. Angela Merici Catholic Church was dedicated in 2017 and seats 2000.

References

External links

 Sienna, Formerly Sienna Plantation
 

Neighborhoods in Missouri City, Texas
Census-designated places in Fort Bend County, Texas
Census-designated places in Texas
Greater Houston